ENPPI Sporting Club, simply known as ENPPI, is an Egyptian football club based in Cairo, that competes in the Egyptian Premier League. The club is related to Enppi (Engineering For The Petroleum And Process Industries), which was established in 1978.

Honours

 Egypt Cup
 Winners (2): 2004–05, 2010–11

Performance in CAF competitions
PR = Preliminary round
FR = First round
SR = Second round
PO = Play-off round
SF = Semi-final

Performance in domestic competitions

Players

Current squad

Out on loan

Managers
 Taha Basry (July 1, 2001 – June 30, 2006)
 Rainer Zobel (May 25, 2006 – Feb 1, 2007)
 Hany Ramzy (Feb 1, 2007 – Sept 30, 2008)
 Anwar Salama (July 1, 2007 – Aug 10, 2009)
 Stoycho Mladenov (Jan 1, 2010 – July 12, 2011)
 Mokhtar Mokhtar (July 12, 2011 – Dec 27, 2011)
 Hossam El-Badry (Dec 29, 2011 – May 20, 2012)
 Tarek El Ashry (May 23, 2012 – July 9, 2013)
 Mohamed Helmy (July 24, 2013 – Dec 13, 2013)
 Khaled Metwali (interim) (Feb 13, 2014 – Feb 25, 2014)
 Michael Krüger (Feb 25, 2014–2015)
 Hany Ramzy (2015 – Jan 2016)
  Khalid Mitwally (Caretaker) (Jan 2016 – )
 Alaa Abd Elaal
 Helmy Toulan (Oct 18, 2019 – 2022)
 Jorvan Vieira (June 5, 2022 –)

References

External links
 Official Website 

 
Football clubs in Cairo
Association football clubs established in 1985
1985 establishments in Egypt